is the 13th studio album by Japanese singer/songwriter Mari Hamada, released on March 11, 1996. Produced by Hamada and Steve Tyrell, it was Hamada's final release by MCA Victor. The album was reissued alongside Hamada's past releases on January 15, 2014.

Persona peaked at No. 2 on Oricon's albums chart. It was also her last album to be certified Platinum by the RIAJ. In addition, it was her last top-10 album until Gracia in 2018.

Track listing

Personnel 
 Michael Landau – guitar
 Lee Ritenour – guitar
 Tim Pierce – guitar
 Dean Parks – guitar
 Leland Sklar – bass
 Abraham Laboriel – bass
 Neil Stubenhaus – bass
 Robbie Buchanan – keyboards
 Kevin Savigor – keyboards
 John Robinson – drums
 Mike Baird – drums
 Carlos Vega – drums
 Lenny Castro – percussion

Charts

Certification

References

External links 
  (Mari Hamada)
  (Universal Music Japan)
 
 

1996 albums
Japanese-language albums
Mari Hamada albums
Universal Music Japan albums